Bijnor railway station is a railway station in India where Mussoori express, Garhwal express, Chandigarh Lucknow express trains are stopped. The only railway station is the Najibabad Junction Railway Station in Bijnor district where maximum trains stopped and starts and terminates. Its code is BJO. It serves Bijnor city. The station consists of three platforms. The platforms are not well sheltered. It lacks many facilities including water and sanitation.

Trains 
Some of the trains that run from Bijnor are:

 Mussoorie Express
 Najibabad–Moradabad Passenger (via Gajraula)
 Lucknow–Chandigarh Express (via Gajraula)
 Garhwal Express

References

Railway stations in Bijnor district
Moradabad railway division
Bijnor